James J. Cavanagh  (1850 – October 14, 1890) was a Major League Baseball first baseman and outfielder.  Cavanagh was born in the United Kingdom. Cavanagh played for the Brooklyn Eckfords in 1872. He died in Brooklyn, New York on October 14, 1890.

References

External links

1850 births
1890 deaths
Brooklyn Eckfords players
Major League Baseball outfielders
Major League Baseball first basemen
19th-century baseball players
Burials at Calvary Cemetery (Queens)